Zain Wright (born 18 April 1979 in Tasmania) is a former field hockey midfielder from Australia, who was a member of the Men's National Team just after the 2000 Summer Olympics in Sydney, Australia.

References

1979 births
Living people
Australian male field hockey players
Sportsmen from Tasmania